The 1999 Sunda Strait earthquake occurred on December 21 at 21:14:57 local time in Sunda Strait region near the island of Java, Indonesia with a moment magnitude of 6.5.

Earthquake
The earthquake struck at 21:14 pm (local time), at a moderate depth of 56 km. The earthquake was widely felt along the western part of Java and southeastern Sumatra. In Jakarta the shaking was moderate, in Bandung, Bekasi, and Liwa the shaking was weak.

Damage
Five people were killed in Pandeglang, and more than 220 people were injured. 2,800 houses were damaged, mostly in western Java, where half of them were completely destroyed. Minor damage like cracks in walls were also reported in Jakarta.

See also
List of earthquakes in 1999
List of earthquakes in Indonesia
2019 Sunda Strait earthquake

References

Earthquakes in Java
Earthquakes in Indonesia
1999 disasters in Indonesia
Sunda Strait
1999 in Indonesia
December 1999 events in Asia
1999 earthquakes